Louise Dean may refer to:

 Louise Dean (author), British novelist
 Louise Dean (singer) (1971–1995), British singer with House band Shiva